The Ministry of Agriculture and Rural Development of the Republic of Poland was formed in October 1999 from the Ministry of Agriculture and Food Economy of Poland; the ministry can trace its history to 1944.

The Ministry's 1999 incarnation was brought about because development of rural regions was Poland's greatest political, economic, and social challenge that was uncontested by both coalition and opposition politicians.

The ministry is concerned with various aspects of Polish agriculture and improving its rural areas.

The current minister is Henryk Kowalczyk

List of ministers

Ministers of Agriculture and Food Economy (1989–1999)

References

External links
 Ministry web page in English, retrieved on 21 September 2012.
 Country Report on Poland, European Commission Directorate-General for Agriculture, July 2002, Retrieved 17 December 2007.

1999 establishments in Poland
Poland
Poland, Agriculture
Agriculture
Agriculture Ministers
Poland, Agriculture
Rural development ministries
Agricultural organisations based in Poland
Agriculture